Lou Mitchell's, also known as Lou Mitchell's Restaurant, is a Chicago diner located at 565 W. Jackson Boulevard. It is a popular restaurant for commuters, as it is located near Union Station. It is also located near the start of U.S. Route 66 and was frequented by many people at the start of their journey along the road, earning it the nickname "the first stop on the Mother Road." In May 2002, the Nationwide Route 66 restoration program was launched at Lou Mitchell's. It was listed on the National Register of Historic Places in 2006.

Founded in 1923, Lou Mitchell's is known for handing out fresh donut holes to people waiting in line, boxes of Milk Duds to children, an orange slice and prune for breakfast, and a small cup of ice cream with each meal. Their egg dishes are made using double-yolk eggs, which they claim makes the eggs larger and fluffier.

Lou Mitchell's has been owned by Heleen Thanasouras. She appeared as the guest judge for the Quickfire Challenge of Episode 11 of Top Chef (season 4), which involved working at "the hull", or egg station, at the restaurant for twenty minutes.

In November 2015, Heleen died at age 63.

References

External links

1923 establishments in Illinois
U.S. Route 66 in Illinois
Restaurants in Chicago
Tourist attractions along U.S. Route 66
Commercial buildings on the National Register of Historic Places in Chicago
Restaurants established in 1923
Diners on the National Register of Historic Places
Diners in Illinois